Music Hall is a 1934 British musical drama film directed by John Baxter and starring George Carney, Ben Field and Mark Daly. It was made at Twickenham Studios as a quota quickie.

The film's sets were designed by James A. Carter.

Cast
 George Carney as Bill  
 Ben Field as Steve  
 Mark Daly as Scotty  
 Helena Pickard as Lou  
 Olive Sloane 
 Wally Patch as Fred  
 Derrick De Marney as Jim  
 Peggy Novak 
 Edgar Driver as Tich  
 C. Denier Warren as Bendini 
 Walter Amner
 Eve Chapman
 Wilson Coleman as Mr. Davis  
 Bertram Dench 
 G.H. Elliott as himself  
 Roddy Hughes 
 Raymond Newell 
 Gershom Parkington
 The Sherman Fisher Girls as Themselves  
 Debroy Somers as himself  
 Harry Terry as Flies  
 John Turnbull as Collins  
 Freddie Watts as Bert Catchpole  
 D.J. Williams

References

Bibliography
 Chibnall, Steve. Quota Quickies: The Birth of the British 'B' Film. British Film Institute, 2007.
 Low, Rachael. Filmmaking in 1930s Britain. George Allen & Unwin, 1985.
 Wood, Linda. British Films, 1927-1939. British Film Institute, 1986.

External links

1934 films
British musical drama films
1930s musical drama films
1930s English-language films
Films directed by John Baxter
Quota quickies
Films shot at Twickenham Film Studios
British black-and-white films
1934 drama films
1930s British films